The 9th constituency of Bouches-du-Rhône is a French legislative constituency in Bouches-du-Rhône.

Deputies

Elections

2022

 
 
 
 
 
 
 
 
|-
| colspan="8" bgcolor="#E9E9E9"|
|-

2017

2012

|- style="background-color:#E9E9E9;text-align:center;"
! colspan="2" rowspan="2" style="text-align:left;" | Candidate
! rowspan="2" colspan="2" style="text-align:left;" | Party
! colspan="2" | 1st round
! colspan="2" | 2nd round
|- style="background-color:#E9E9E9;text-align:center;"
! width="75" | Votes
! width="30" | %
! width="75" | Votes
! width="30" | %
|-
| style="background-color:" |
| style="text-align:left;" | Bernard Deflesselles
| style="text-align:left;" | Union for a Popular Movement
| UMP
| 
| 35.28%
| 
| 62.56%
|-
| style="background-color:" |
| style="text-align:left;" | Joëlle Melin
| style="text-align:left;" | Front National
| FN
| 
| 22.25%
| 
| 37.44%
|-
| style="background-color:" |
| style="text-align:left;" | Denis Grandjean
| style="text-align:left;" | Europe Ecology – The Greens
| EELV
| 
| 19.03%
| colspan="2" style="text-align:left;" |
|-
| style="background-color:" |
| style="text-align:left;" | Pierre Mingaud
| style="text-align:left;" | Left Front
| FG
| 
| %
| colspan="2" style="text-align:left;" |
|-
| style="background-color:" |
| style="text-align:left;" | Christian Musumeci
| style="text-align:left;" | Miscellaneous Left
| DVG
| 
| 3.86%
| colspan="2" style="text-align:left;" |
|-
| style="background-color:" |
| style="text-align:left;" | Michèle Lesbrot
| style="text-align:left;" | Ecologist
| ECO
| 
| 1.58%
| colspan="2" style="text-align:left;" |
|-
| style="background-color:" |
| style="text-align:left;" | Jean-Marie Orihuel
| style="text-align:left;" | 
| CEN
| 
| 1.38%
| colspan="2" style="text-align:left;" |
|-
| style="background-color:" |
| style="text-align:left;" | Stéphanie Poggi
| style="text-align:left;" | Other
| AUT
| 
| 0.66%
| colspan="2" style="text-align:left;" |
|-
| style="background-color:" |
| style="text-align:left;" | Colette Gereux-Beltra
| style="text-align:left;" | Miscellaneous Right
| DVD
| 
| 0.40%
| colspan="2" style="text-align:left;" |
|-
| style="background-color:" |
| style="text-align:left;" | Claude Diharçabal
| style="text-align:left;" | Far Left
| EXG
| 
| 0.37%
| colspan="2" style="text-align:left;" |
|-
| style="background-color:" |
| style="text-align:left;" | François Otchakovsky-Laurens
| style="text-align:left;" | Far Left
| EXG
| 
| 0.28%
| colspan="2" style="text-align:left;" |
|-
| style="background-color:" |
| style="text-align:left;" | Serge Paloyan
| style="text-align:left;" | Other
| AUT
| 
| 0.00%
| colspan="2" style="text-align:left;" |
|-
| colspan="8" style="background-color:#E9E9E9;"|
|- style="font-weight:bold"
| colspan="4" style="text-align:left;" | Total
| 
| 100%
| 
| 100%
|-
| colspan="8" style="background-color:#E9E9E9;"|
|-
| colspan="4" style="text-align:left;" | Registered voters
| 
| style="background-color:#E9E9E9;"|
| 
| style="background-color:#E9E9E9;"|
|-
| colspan="4" style="text-align:left;" | Blank/Void ballots
| 
| 1.28%
| 
| 12.86%
|-
| colspan="4" style="text-align:left;" | Turnout
| 
| 59.01%
| 
| 49.52%
|-
| colspan="4" style="text-align:left;" | Abstentions
| 
| 40.99%
| 
| 50.48%
|-
| colspan="8" style="background-color:#E9E9E9;"|
|- style="font-weight:bold"
| colspan="6" style="text-align:left;" | Result
| colspan="2" style="background-color:" | UMP HOLD
|}

2007

2002

 
 
 
 
|-
| colspan="8" bgcolor="#E9E9E9"|
|-

1997

 
 
 
 
 
 
 
|-
| colspan="8" bgcolor="#E9E9E9"|
|-

References

9